The Penn State Board of Trustees is the 38-member governing body for The Pennsylvania State University. Its members include the university's president, the Governor of the Commonwealth, and the state Secretaries of Agriculture, Conservation and Natural Resources, and Education, as well as a representative for the Governor. The other members include six trustees appointed by the Governor, nine elected by alumni, six elected by Pennsylvania agricultural societies, six by a board representing business and industry enterprises, 3 at-large, 1 student, and 1 academic trustee. Undergraduate students do not elect any trustees; the court case Benner v. Oswald ruled that the Equal Protection Clause of the Fourteenth Amendment did not require the undergraduate students be allowed to participate in the selection of trustees.

As of 2022, the chair of the board of trustees is Matthew W. Schuyler, a graduate of Penn State and chief brand officer at Hilton.

The main responsibilities of the board are to select the president of Penn State, to determine the goals and strategic direction of the University, and to approve the annual budget. Regular meetings of the board are held bi-monthly and take place primarily on the University Park campus, although on occasion meetings are held at other locations within the Commonwealth.

Current membership
Members listed below as of May 31, 2022. Note: The date in parentheses following each name below indicates the year in which the term will expire. Trustees appointed by the Governor serve until their successors have been appointed and confirmed.

Members ex officio
Neeli Bendapudi, President, The Pennsylvania State University (Secretary of the Board of Trustees)
Josh Shapiro, Governor, Commonwealth of Pennsylvania
Russell C. Redding, Secretary, Pennsylvania Department of Agriculture
Cynthia A. Dunn, Secretary, Pennsylvania Department of Conservation and Natural Resources
Eric Hagarty, Acting Secretary, Department of Education, Pennsylvania Department of Education

Appointed by the Governor
Abraham Amorós (2024) Director of Operations, PA Municipal League
Daniel J. Delligatti (2023) President and Owner/Operator, M&J Management Corporation
J. Alex Hartzler (2022) Managing Partner & Founder, WCI Partners, LP
David M. Kleppinger (2022) Chairman Emeritus, McNees Wallace and Nurick, LLC (Vice Chairman of the Board of Trustees)
Terry Pegula (2024) CEO, Buffalo Bills, Buffalo Sabres, and JKLM Energy, LLC
Stanley I. Rapp (2023) Partner, Greenlee Partners, LLC
Governor's Non-Voting Representative: William S. Shipley, III, Chairman, Shipley Group

Elected by Alumni
Edward B. Brown, III (2022) President & CEO, KETCHConsulting, Inc.
Alvin F. de Levie (2024) Attorney and Founder, Law Offices of Alvin F. de Levie
Barbara L. Doran (2022) CEO/CIO, BD8 Capital Partners, LLC
Anthony P. Lubrano (2023) President, A.P. Lubrano and Company, Inc.
William F. Oldsey (2022) Independent Consultant/Educational Publishing
Joseph Vincent “Jay” Paterno (2023) President, Blue Line 409 LLC
Alice W. Pope (2023) Retired Associate Professor, Department of Psychology, St. John's University
Brandon D. Short (2024) Executive Director and Portfolio Manager, PGIM Real Estate
Steven B. Wagman (2024) National Healthcare Business Leader, Siemens Industry, Inc. – Smart Infrastructure Division

Elected by Delegates from Agricultural Societies
Randall “Randy” E. Black (2023) CEO and President, First Citizens Community Bank
Donald W. Cairns (2024) Owner/Operator, Cairns Family Farm
Valerie L. Detwiler (2022) Senior Vice President, Senior Commercial Banker, Reliance Bank
Lynn A. Dietrich (2023) Retired Professional Engineer (PE)
M. Abraham Harpster (2022) Co-Owner, Evergreen Farms, Inc.
Chris R. Hoffman (2024) Vice President, Pennsylvania Farm Bureau

Elected by Board Representing Business and Industry
Mark H. Dambly (2023) President, Pennrose Properties, LLC
Robert E. Fenza (2024) Retired Chief Operating Officer, Liberty Property Trust
Walter C. Rakowich (2023) Retired Chief Executive Officer, Prologis
Mary Lee Schneider (2024) Former President and CEO, SG360°
Vacant
Vacant

Elected By Board At-Large
Kathleen L. Casey (2022) Senior Advisor, Patomak Global Partners, LLC; KLC Consulting Group, LLC
Julie Anna Potts (2024) President and CEO, North American Meat Institute
Matthew W. Schuyler (2023) Chief Brand Officer, Hilton Worldwide (Chairman of the Board of Trustees)

Student Trustee
Janiyah R. Davis (2023) Student, The Pennsylvania State University

Academic Trustee
Nicholas J. Rowland (2024) Professor of Sociology, Penn State Altoona

Immediate Past President, Alumni Association 
Randolph B. Houston, Jr. (2023) Assistant General Counsel, Buzzfeed, Inc.

Emeriti trustees
H. Jesse Arnelle, Attorney
Cynthia A. Baldwin, Retired Justice, Supreme Court of Pennsylvania
James S. Broadhurst, Chairman, Eat'n Park Hospitality Group, Inc.
Charles C. Brosius, Retired President, Marlboro Mushrooms
Walter J. Conti, Retired Owner, Cross Keys Inn/Pipersville Inn
Donald M. Cook, Jr., Retired President, SEMCOR, Incorporated
Marian U. Barash Coppersmith, Retired Chairman of the Board, The Barash Group
Robert M. Frey, Attorney-at-Law, Frey & Tiley, P.C.
Steve A. Garban, Senior Vice President for Finance and Operations/Treasurer Emeritus
Samuel E. Hayes, Jr.
David R. Jones, Retired Assistant Managing Editor, The New York Times
Edward P. Junker, III, Retired Vice Chairman, PNC Bank Corporation
Robert D. Metzgar, Former President, North Penn Pipe & Supply, Incorporated
Joel N. Myers, President, AccuWeather, Inc.
Anne Riley, English Teacher
Barry K. Robinson, Attorney-at-Law
L. J. Rowell, Jr., Retired Chairman and Chief Executive Officer, Provident Mutual Life Insurance
Kevin R. Steele, Past President, Penn State Alumni Association
Cecile M. Springer, President, Springer Associates
Paul V. Suhey, Orthopedic Surgeon, Martin & Suhey Orthopedics
Helen D. Wise, Former Deputy Chief of Staff for Programs and Secretary of the Cabinet, Governor's Office
Boyd E. Wolff, Retired, Owner and Operator Wolfden Farms
Quentin E. Wood, Retired Chairman of the Board and Chief Executive Officer, Quaker State Corporation
Edward P. Zemprelli, Attorney

References

Pennsylvania State University